Union Sportive Municipale d'Olivet is a French association football club founded in 1960. They are based in the town of Olivet, Loiret and their home stadium is the Stade du Couasnon. As of the 2009–10 season, the club plays in the Promotion d'honneur de Centre, the seventh tier of French football.
Their u19 team are in Division d'honneur régionale. Since the arrival of captain Enzo Lehocq, they have seen success.

External links
USM Olivet official website 

Olivet
Olivet
1960 establishments in France
Sport in Loiret
Football clubs in Centre-Val de Loire